These are the official results of the Women's Shot Put event at the 1987 World Championships in Rome, Italy. The final was held on Saturday September 5, 1987.

Medalists

Schedule
All times are Central European Time (UTC+1)

Abbreviations
All results shown are in metres

Records

Qualification
Held on Friday 1987-09-04

Final

See also
 1982 Women's European Championships Shot Put (Athens)
 1984 Women's Olympic Shot Put (Los Angeles)
 1986 Women's European Championships Shot Put (Stuttgart)
 1987 Shot Put Year Ranking
 1988 Women's Olympic Shot Put (Seoul)

References
 Results

S
Shot put at the World Athletics Championships
1987 in women's athletics